The Great Military March Forward: Engulf the Southwest, also known as The Liberation of Southwest China, is a 1998 Chinese epic war film directed by Song Yeming and Zhu Jianming and written by Lu Zhuguo. The film stars Fu Xuecheng, Lu Qi, Gu Yue, and Zhao Hengduo. The film is about the war between the Communist troops and the KMT troops in southwest China during the Chinese Civil War.

Plot
In September 1949, after the three major campaigns (Liaoshen Campaign, Huaihai Campaign and Pingjin Campaign), the People's Liberation Army (PLA) has basically achieved control over the provinces and cities of mainland China, the KMT troops are evacuated to Chongqing, Mao Zedong and Zhu De plan to make a final battle against the Kuomintang, soon the war in southwest China's Sichuan, Chongqing break out, the People's Liberation Army defeat the KMT troops, the KMT troops is forced to retreat to Taiwan.

Cast

Main
 Fu Xuecheng as Liu Bocheng
 Lu Qi as Deng Xiaoping
 Gu Yue as Mao Zedong
 Zhao Hengduo as Chiang Kai-shek

Supporting
 Xu Guangming as Hu Zongnan
 Wang Fengbin as Song Xilian
 Wang Lanwu as Li Da
 Gao Changli as He Long
 Liu Huaizheng as Zhu De
 Peng Zhidong as Wang Tiehan
 Hu Xilong as Chen Kefei
 Wang Jingwen as Zhong Bin
 Qin Zhao as Chiang Ching-kuo
 Wang Hui as Luo Lie
 Yang Ciyu as Liu Wenhui
 Ding Jingyi as Deng Xihou
 Weng Xianqiao as Zhang Qun
 Zhao Zhi as Li Wen
 Li Guohua as Luo Guangwen
 Guan Shouyi as Pei Changhui
 Tang Gaoqi as Zhang Boying
 Yao Jude

Release
The Great Military March Forward: Engulf the Southwest was released in China on September 24, 1998.

Accolades

References

External links
 
 

1998 films
Chinese war drama films
Chinese historical films
1990s war drama films
Chinese epic films
Films set in the 1940s
Films set in Chongqing
Films set in Sichuan
Films shot in Sichuan
Films shot in Chongqing
Cultural depictions of Mao Zedong
Cultural depictions of Deng Xiaoping
Cultural depictions of Chiang Kai-shek
1998 drama films
1990s Mandarin-language films